Hyloxalus awa is a species of frog in the family Dendrobatidae. It is endemic to Ecuador and known from the western Andean slopes and the western Pacific lowlands.

Description
Males measure  and females  in snout–vent length. Dorsum is reddish brown with diffuse dark marks. Flanks are dark gray.

Reproduction
The male call is a trill of about 3–5 seconds in duration, emitted at a rate of six calls per minute. Males are territorial and aggressive towards other males. Under laboratory conditions, mating takes place in morning and clutch size is 4 to 21 eggs. Eggs are laid on leaf-litter or low vegetation; the adults carry the tadpoles on their back to nearby streams where they complete their development.

Habitat and conservation
Natural habitats of Hyloxalus awa are humid sub-montane tropical forest. It is threatened by habitat loss due to agriculture (both crops and livestock), logging, and agricultural pollution.

References

awa
Amphibians of Ecuador
Endemic fauna of Ecuador
Amphibians described in 1995
Taxonomy articles created by Polbot